Alfriyanto Nico Saputro (born 3 April 2003) is an Indonesian professional footballer who plays as a winger for Liga 1 club Persija Jakarta and the Indonesia national under-20 team.

Club career

Persija Jakarta
He was signed for Persija Jakarta to play in Liga 1 in the 2021 season. Nico made his first-team debut on 5 September 2021 in a match against PSS Sleman. On 24 September 2021, Nico scored his first goal for Persija in a 2–1 win over Persela Lamongan at the Pakansari Stadium, Bogor.

Through this goal, Nico is listed as the youngest goalscorer in 2021-22 Liga 1 at the age of 18 years five months 21 days, for Nico, his goal is an indicator that Persija's young players are able to make a big contribution to the team.

International career
On 30 May 2022, Nico made his debut for an Indonesian youth team against a Venezuela U-20 squad in the 2022 Maurice Revello Tournament in France. In October 2022, it was reported that Nico received a call-up from the Indonesia U-20 for a training camp, in Turkey and Spain.

Career statistics

Club

Notes

International goals
International under-19 goals

Honours

Club 
 Persija Jakarta
 Menpora Cup: 2021

Individual
 Liga 1 Young Player of the Month: October 2021

References

External links
 Alfriyanto Nico at Soccerway
 Alfriyanto Nico at Liga Indonesia

2003 births
Living people
People from Surakarta
Sportspeople from Central Java
Indonesian footballers
Liga 1 (Indonesia) players
Persija Jakarta players
Indonesia youth international footballers
Association football midfielders